The 2016–17 North Carolina Central Eagles men's basketball team represented North Carolina Central University during the 2016–17 NCAA Division I men's basketball season. The Eagles, led by eighth-year head coach LeVelle Moton, played their home games at McLendon–McDougald Gymnasium in Durham, North Carolina as members of the Mid-Eastern Athletic Conference. They finished the season 25–9, 13–3 in MEAC play to win the MEAC regular season championship. In the MEAC tournament, they defeated Bethune–Cookman, Maryland Eastern Shores and Norfolk State to be champions of the. As a result, they earned the MEAC's automatic bid to the NCAA tournament as a No. 16 seed. There they lost in the First Four to fellow No. 16 seed UC Davis.

Previous season
The Eagles finished the 2015–16 season 13–19, 7–9 in MEAC play to finish in a tie for fifth place. They beat Howard in the first round of the MEAC tournament, before falling to Norfolk State in the quarterfinals.

Preseason 
The Eagles were picked to finish in fourth place in the preseason MEAC poll. Patrick Cole was named to the preseason All-MEAC second team.

Roster

Schedule

|-
!colspan=9 style="background:#; color:white;"| Non-conference regular season

|-
!colspan=9 style="background:#; color:white;"| MEAC regular season

|-
!colspan=9 style="background:#; color:white;"| MEAC tournament

|-
!colspan=9 style="background:#; color:white;"|

References

North Carolina Central Eagles men's basketball seasons
North Carolina Central
North Carolina Central
2016 in sports in North Carolina
2017 in sports in North Carolina